Oleg Igorevich Ponomaryov (born 12 January 1991) is a former Russian professional football player.

Club career
He made his Russian Football National League debut for FC Dynamo Barnaul on 15 May 2008 in a game against FC Kuban Krasnodar. That was his only season in the FNL.

External links
 

1991 births
Sportspeople from Barnaul
Living people
Russian footballers
Association football midfielders
FC Dynamo Barnaul players